Harold John Jamieson (born 9 December 1908) was an English professional footballer who played as an outside right.

Career
Born in Wallsend, Jamieson signed for Bradford City in June 1928 from Wallsend, leaving the club in July 1929 to play for Crawcrook Albion. During his time with Bradford City he made two appearances in the Football League.

In November 1932, Jamieson was signed by Wigan Athletic, making 15 appearances for the club in the Cheshire League.

Sources

References

1908 births
Date of death missing
English footballers
Wallsend F.C. players
Bradford City A.F.C. players
Crystal Palace F.C. players
Gillingham F.C. players
Wigan Athletic F.C. players
English Football League players
Association football inside forwards
Sportspeople from Wallsend
Footballers from Tyne and Wear